BASEketball is a 1998 American sports comedy film co-written and directed by David Zucker and starring South Park creators Trey Parker and Matt Stone, along with Yasmine Bleeth, Jenny McCarthy, Robert Vaughn, Ernest Borgnine, and Dian Bachar.

The film is about the sport of BASEketball, a hybrid sport combining baseball and basketball that was invented by Zucker in the 1980s. Parker and Stone play childhood friends who invent the game as something they could win against more athletic types. The sport becomes a nationwide league sport and a target of corporate sponsorship.

This is the only work involving Parker and Stone that was neither written, directed, nor produced by them. The film was a box office disappointment and received mixed critical reviews. 

BASEketball is credited with coining the Internet slang term "derp".

Plot
Joe "Coop" Cooper and Doug Remer, two slackers and lifelong best friends, gate crash a high-school reunion and are shunned by their classmates. They find themselves outside drinking beer and shooting a basketball when two classmates challenge them to a game. After seeing that their opponents are very good at basketball, they say they will only play a game they picked up in the streets (while secretly inventing the rules as they play, based on both basketball and baseball). After winning, they decide to refine the rules to the game and Coop makes the first BASEketball out of a La-Z-Boy chair. Their friend, Kenny "Squeak" Scolari, tags along and the sport becomes very popular in the neighborhood over the next six months.

Businessman Ted Denslow meets Coop and Remer and proposes the creation of the National BASEketball League (NBL) along with numerous rules in place to prevent its decline: teams cannot switch cities, players cannot be traded, individuals cannot make money via corporate sponsorship deals, and it is completely open to anyone who wants to play, with Denslow stating that "anyone can be a sports hero". Coop is reluctant, but ultimately accepts the opportunity.

Five years later, the NBL is in full swing with teams, fans, stadiums, and a major championship, the Denslow Cup. Denslow is owner of the Milwaukee Beers, Coop and Remer's team. During the championship game, Denslow dies from choking on a hot dog, causing Coop to miss his shot and costing the Beers the game. Denslow's will names Coop as owner of the Beers for one year on the condition that they win the next Denslow Cup; otherwise, ownership reverts to Denslow's widow Yvette. Coop and Remer then meet Jenna Reed, head of the Dream Come True Foundation, and Joey, one of the children in her care and a passionate fan of BASEketball; Coop, Remer and Squeak begin spending time with the two, with Coop eventually forming a relationship with Jenna.

Baxter Cain, owner of the Dallas Felons, wants to remove Denslow's rules preventing monetization of the sport, but could not while Denslow was alive. However, Coop refuses to accept any changes; Cain partners with Yvette as he tries to make the Beers lose the next Denslow Cup so she will own the team; however, the Beers still continue winning games and heading towards the championship. Cain approaches Remer, telling him that he made an offer to Coop, but Coop refused without telling Remer. Remer confronts Coop about what Cain told him, and Coop quickly compromises by declaring Remer part owner of the team.

Later, Cain cuts the funding to Jenna's foundation in an attempt to get Coop and Remer to adopt a clothing line; Coop is against it, but Remer agrees and becomes conceited with his newfound A-list status. After the semifinals, Cain informs Coop and Remer that the clothing line has been produced through child labor in Calcutta; if the public finds out, the team and Jenna's foundation will be ruined. Cain blackmails Coop and Remer into losing or forfeiting the Denslow Cup game or he will inform the public. Jenna learns about the scandal and breaks up with Coop, as Coop and Remer blame each other for the controversy.

With their friendship dissolved, Coop goes to Calcutta, aiming to resolve the situation by replacing the child workers with adults. Making it back to the championship game just as it begins, Coop and Remer still argue with each other and the Beers are losing; by the seventh-inning stretch, the Beers are down 16–0. Having had enough of Coop and Remer's feuding, Squeak gives the stadium an impassioned speech, reminding Coop and Remer where they came from, how much they changed everyone else's lives, and what they risk losing. Motivated, Coop and Remer reconcile their differences as Yvette, also moved by Squeak's speech, breaks off her alliance with Cain. After shifting their focus back in the game, they are poised to win when Coop's La-Z-Boy pops. Coop is crestfallen until Joey brings him a new BASEketball made from a Barcalounger. After a risky last throw, they win the Denslow Cup. Jenna and Coop reconcile as Yvette makes out with Remer and the both of them skate around the stadium with their new trophy.

Cast

Cameo appearances

Production 
David Zucker, who then had a first-look deal at Universal Pictures, pitched the idea of a low-brow comedy about a game he invented and played in the 1980s. Zucker had previously attempted to adapt the idea into a TV series without success. A pilot episode was filmed which starred Chris Rock, but it did not materialize into a series.

When Zucker got the green-light from Universal, he had wanted Chris Farley to play the lead role before casting Parker and Stone due to their work with South Park becoming a huge hit. The duo agreed to do the movie under the assumption that their show would have been canceled by the time filming began, which did not happen; the show is still on the air as of 2023.

Soundtrack
The soundtrack featured a bouncy ska cover of Norwegian band A-ha's signature single "Take On Me" by Reel Big Fish. The band also appears as the live entertainment at the home stadium of the Milwaukee Beers, playing "Take On Me" and several of their other songs. The soundtrack also includes the Smash Mouth cover of the popular War song "Why Can't We Be Friends?" and a cover of Harry Belafonte's "Jump In The Line (Shake Shake Senora)" by Cherry Poppin' Daddies.

Critical reception

Box office
BASEketball was released on July 31, 1998, opening alongside The Parent Trap, The Negotiator, and Ever After. It debuted in the #11 spot in its opening weekend, which was led by Saving Private Ryan. Its domestic total was $7,027,290.

Critical response
On Rotten Tomatoes, BASEketball has an approval rating of 41%, with an average rating of 5.30/10, based on 51 reviews from critics. The website's critics consensus reads, "Baseketball isn't just a succession of fouls thanks to the comedic zip of David Zucker's direction, but sophomoric gags and a lack of performance hustle by Trey Parker and Matt Stone makes this satire a clumsy bunt." On Metacritic, the film has a weighted average score of 38 out of 100, based on reviews from 18 critics, indicating "Generally unfavorable reviews". Audiences surveyed by CinemaScore gave the film a grade B on scale of A to F.

In a positive review with Variety, Leonard Klady said BASEketball "has the heightened entertainment challenge of presenting an invented sport ... The film's physical comedy should translate well internationally and chalk up high scores on video". The film was awarded four stars out of five by Empire magazine's Ian Freer, who called it funny but described the humor as sometimes hit-and-miss. Conversely, Los Angeles Times Jack Mathews labeled the film as sleep-inducing and "by far the most inane and badly written of the comedies made by any of the creators of the classic 1980 sendup Airplane!". Michael O'Sullivan in The Washington Post'''' called the film "dark, dull, witless and hobbled by poor comic timing," comparing its gross-out humor unfavorably to that of There's Something About Mary. Roger Ebert echoed this sentiment in his negative review in the Chicago Sun-Times, giving the film one and a half stars out of four and saying the film "tries to buy laughs with puerile shocks".

Accolades
For their roles in the film, Yasmine Bleeth and Jenny McCarthy were nominated at the 1998 Golden Raspberry Awards, for the Worst Actress and Worst Supporting Actress awards, respectively. Bleeth lost to the Spice Girls (for Spice World) while McCarthy lost to Maria Pitillo (Godzilla).

In popular culture
In response to a negative review from Roger Ebert, Parker and Stone named South Park second season's eleventh episode "Roger Ebert Should Lay Off the Fatty Foods". Parker and Stone also referenced BASEketball negative reception in South Park season-eight episode "The Passion of the Jew".BASEketball is credited with coining the Internet slang term "derp". Parker and Stone later referenced the term in South Park third season episode "The Succubus", where Chef is replaced by Mr. Derp.

See also
 "Sarcastaball", an episode of South Park''

References

External links

 
 
  

1990s sports comedy films
1990s buddy comedy films
1998 comedy films
1998 films
American baseball films
American basketball films
American buddy comedy films
American slapstick comedy films
American sports comedy films
Fictional ball games
Fictional basketball players
Films directed by David Zucker (director)
Films scored by Ira Newborn
Films set in Wisconsin
Films with screenplays by David Zucker (filmmaker)
Universal Pictures films
1990s English-language films
1990s American films